Brachytrupes megacephalus is a species of cricket in the family Gryllidae.

Description and behavior
This species is characterized by a very large head (hence the species name megacephalus) and  strong jaws. The tibia of the front and rear legs are armed with big teeth which facilitate the action of digging the deep holes in sandy soils in which these crickets live. These insects have crepuscular and nocturnal habits. The mating period extends from mid-March to the end of April. After mating, the males keep the females captive in their holes until they lay their eggs.

Distribution and habitat
This species can be found in sandy environments in Sardinia, Sicily, Malta and North Africa.

Bibliography
 Saussure. 1877. Mem. Soc. Phys. Hist. Nat. Geneve 25(1):285 [117]
 Kirby, W.F. 1906. A Synonymic Catalogue of Orthoptera (Orthoptera Saltatoria, Locustidae vel Acridiidae) 2:23
 Giglio-Tos. 1907. Boll. Musei Zool. Anat. Comp. R. Univ. Torino 22(563):23
 Lefebvre. 1827. Ann. Soc. Linn. Paris 6:10
 Serville. Histoire naturelle des insectes. Orthoptères 326  
 Randell. 1964. Canadian Ent. 96:1587 >> Brachytrupes megacephalus
 Massa. 2009. Jour. Orth. Res. 18(1):78 >> Brachytrupes megacephalus
 Cassar. 2009. Bulletin of the Entomological Society of Malta 2:126 >> Brachytrupes megacephalus
 Sahnoun, Doumandji & Desutter-Grandcolas. 2010. Zootaxa 2432:8 >> Brachytrupes megacephalus
 Brizio, C. 2018. Biodiversity Journal, 2018, 9 (2): 135–142 >> Bioacoustic evidence of two uncommon crickets from SW Sardinia, including an analysis of the song of B. megacephalus  in the ultrasonic range

References

Gryllinae
Insects described in 1827